Jayatissa is a Sinhalese surname. Notable people with the surname include:

Jayatissa Ranaweera (born 1956), Sri Lankan politician
Nalinda Jayatissa (born 1977), Sri Lankan politician
Roshan Jayatissa (born 1989), Sri Lankan cricketer

Sinhalese surnames